
This is a list of the 29 players who earned their 2011 PGA Tour card through Q School in 2010. Note: Michael Putnam and Justin Hicks had already qualified for the PGA Tour by placing in the Top 25 during the 2010 Nationwide Tour season; they did not count among the Top 25 Q school graduates, but Putnam did improve his status.

Players in yellow are 2011 PGA Tour rookies.

2011 Results

*PGA Tour rookie in 2011
T = Tied 
Green background indicates the player retained his PGA Tour card for 2012 (finished inside the top 125). 
Yellow background indicates the player did not retain his PGA Tour card for 2012, but retained conditional status (finished between 126-150). 
Red background indicates the player did not retain his PGA Tour card for 2012 (finished outside the top 150).

Winners on the PGA Tour in 2011

Runners-up on the PGA Tour in 2011

See also
2010 Nationwide Tour graduates

References
Short bios from pgatour.com

PGA Tour Qualifying School
PGA Tour Qualifying School Graduates
PGA Tour Qualifying School Graduates